Vovkove is a village in Romny Raion of Sumy Oblast in Ukraine. It previously belonged to Lypova Dolyna Raion until it was abolished on 18 July 2020 as part of the administrative reform of Ukraine, which reduced the number of raions of Sumy Oblast to five.

Demographics
Native language as of the Ukrainian Census of 2001:
 Ukrainian 100%

References

Villages in Romny Raion